Trionychia is a superfamily of turtles which encompasses the species that are commonly referred to as softshelled turtles as well as some others. The group contains two families, Carettochelyidae, which has only one living species, the pig-nosed turtle (Carettochelys insculpta) native to New Guinea and Northern Australia, and Trionychidae, the softshelled turtles, containing numerous species native to Asia, North America and Africa. These families likely diverged during the late Jurassic. The oldest known stem-trionychian is Sinaspideretes from the Late Jurassic of China.

Systematics 
Except for those not assigned to a family, only living genera are listed here.

Family Carettochelyidae
 Subfamily Carettochelyinae
 Genus Carettochelys
Pan-Trionychidae
 Family Plastomenidae (fossil)
 Family Trionychidae
Subfamily Cyclanorbinae
 Genus Cyclanorbis
 Genus Cycloderma
 Genus Lissemys
 Subfamily Trionychinae
 Genus Amyda
 Genus Apalone
 Genus Chitra
 Genus Dogania
 Genus Nilssonia
 Genus Palea
 Genus Pelochelys
 Genus Pelodiscus
 Genus Rafetus
 Genus Trionyx

References

Bibliography